Robert Arthur Douglas Ford,  (January 8, 1915 – April 12, 1998) was a Canadian poet, translator and diplomat.

Born in Ottawa, Ontario, the son of former London Free Press Editor-in Chief and University of Western Ontario Chancellor Arthur Ford, he received his B.A. in history and English in 1937 from the University of Western Ontario and a M.A. in history in 1940 from Cornell University. He joined the Department of External Affairs in 1940 and was Ambassador to Colombia (1957 – 1959), Yugoslavia (1959 – 1961), United Arab Republic (1961 – 1963), and to the USSR (1964 – 1980). Ford served as a special representative od Canada at the 1st Summit of the Non-Aligned Movement in Belgrade.

In 1971 he was made a Companion of the Order of Canada.

Bibliography
 Window on the North, Toronto: The Ryerson Press (1956), winner of the 1956 Governor General's Award for Poetry or Drama
 The Solitary City, Toronto : McClelland & Stewart (1969)
 Holes in Space, Toronto : Hounslow Press (1979)
 Needle in the Eye, Oakville, Ontario : Mosaic Press(1983)
 Doors, Words, and Silence, Oakville, Ontario : Mosaic Press(1985)
 Russian Poetry: A Personal Anthology, Oakville, Ont.: Mosaic Press (1984)
 Dostoevsky and Other Poems, Oakville, Ont., Mosaic Press (1988)
 Our Man in Moscow,Toronto: U of Toronto P (1989)
 Diplomate et Poète à Moscou trans. SHERR, Robert (text) France: Ed. François-Luc Collignon, 1990.
 Coming from Afar, Toronto : McClelland & Stewart, 1990.

Further reading

References

External links
Robert Ford's entry in The Canadian Encyclopedia

1915 births
1998 deaths
20th-century Canadian poets
Canadian male poets
Companions of the Order of Canada
Cornell University alumni
Governor General's Award-winning poets
Writers from Ottawa
University of Western Ontario alumni
Ambassadors of Canada to Colombia
Ambassadors of Canada to Yugoslavia
Ambassadors of Canada to Egypt
Ambassadors of Canada to the Soviet Union
Ambassadors of Canada to Sudan
Ambassadors of Canada to Mongolia
20th-century Canadian male writers